Helena Dahlström (born 13 May 1968) is a Swedish former professional tennis player.

Biography
A right-handed player from Linköping, Dahlström was the girls' singles runner-up at the 1984 Australian Open.

Dahlström competed on the professional tour in the late 1980s and reached a top singles ranking of 166. She won the Australian Hard Court Championships in 1985 and featured in the main draw of the 1986 French Open as a qualifier.

She appeared in two Federation Cup ties for Sweden in 1986, playing both singles and doubles in a World Group fixture against France, then in the consolations rounds against Belgium.

ITF finals

Singles (3–4)

Doubles (1–1)

See also
List of Sweden Fed Cup team representatives

References

External links
 
 
 

1968 births
Living people
Swedish female tennis players
Sportspeople from Linköping
20th-century Swedish women
21st-century Swedish women